This is a list of places of interest in the British county of Essex. See List of places in Essex for a list of settlements in Essex.

Basildon

Braintree

Brentwood

Castle Point

Chelmsford

Colchester

Epping Forest

Harlow

Maldon

Rochford

Southend-on-Sea

Tendring

Thurrock

Uttlesford

References

Essex